Frol Panarin (born 10 September 2002) is a Belarusian footballer who plays for Vitebsk.

References

External links

2001 births
Living people
Belarusian footballers
Association football midfielders
FC Vitebsk players